Festuca altaica, also known as the altai fescue, or the northern rough fescue, is a perennial bunchgrass with a wide native distribution in the Arctic, from central Asia to eastern North America. It is under the synonym F. scabrella, the rough fescue.

Description
Festuca altaica is a densely tufted perennial grass. The tufts are connected by short rhizomes. The upper (adaxial) surface of the leaves is densely covered with short hairs. The inflorescence is a loose panicle. Festuca altaica flowers and fruits from late spring to the fall.

Taxonomy
Festuca altaica was first described in 1829 by Carl Bernhard von Trinius, who wrote the section on grasses in Flora Altaica, whose principal author was Carl Friedrich von Ledebour. Festuca scabrella was described in 1840 by John Torrey in William Jackson Hooker's Flora Boreali-Americana. It was reduced to a subspecies of F. altaica in 1942 and then a variety in 1957. It is now considered to be a synonym of F. altaica.

Distribution
Festuca altaica has a wide Arctic distribution. In temperate Asia it is native to Siberia and the Russian Far East, Kazakhstan, Mongolia and Xinjiang in China. In North America it occurs throughout the subarctic, in western Canada, in parts of eastern Canada (Labrador, Newfoundland and Quebec) and into Michigan in the United States. The Canadian province of Alberta, in the Canadian Prairies region, is home to a large area of grassland containing this species. Under the name Festuca scabrella, rough fescue is the provincial grass of Alberta.

References

altaica
Flora of Siberia
Flora of the Russian Far East
Flora of Xinjiang
Flora of Mongolia
Flora of Subarctic America
Flora of Western Canada
Flora of Labrador
Flora of Newfoundland
Flora of Quebec
Flora of Michigan
Bunchgrasses of North America
Native grasses of the Great Plains region
Grasses of Canada
Grasses of the United States
Flora of the Canadian Prairies
Flora of the Northwestern United States
Flora of Alberta
Provincial symbols of Alberta
Plants described in 1829
Flora without expected TNC conservation status